Larry Anthony Griffin (born January 11, 1963, in Chesapeake, Virginia) is a former American football defensive back who played eight seasons in the National Football League.  He played college football at the University of North Carolina.

External links
NFL.com player page

1963 births
Living people
Sportspeople from Chesapeake, Virginia
American football cornerbacks
American football safeties
North Carolina Tar Heels football players
Miami Dolphins players
Houston Oilers players
Pittsburgh Steelers players
Players of American football from Virginia